Burson is an unincorporated community in Calaveras County, California. It lies at an elevation of 98 feet (45 m). Although unincorporated, Burson has the ZIP code of 95225.

History
Burson was platted in 1884 when the San Joaquin and Sierra Nevada Railroad was extended to that point. The community was named for Daniel Smith Burson, the original owner of the town site. A post office has been in operation at Burson since 1884.

Geography
It is located near Valley Springs and Rancho Calaveras, only a few miles away.

Climate

Burson has a Csa-Hot SummerMediterranean climate typical of the Sierra Nevada foothills. Winters are cool and wet with mild days, chilly nights, and substantial rainfall. Summers are hot and dry with very hot days, cool nights, and minimal rainfall. Due to the orographic effect, rainfall in all seasons is significantly greater than on the valley floor to the west.

References

Unincorporated communities in California
Unincorporated communities in Calaveras County, California